Angel Montes de Oca (born 8 February 2001) is a Dominican professional footballer who plays as a midfielder for Dominican club Cibao FC and the Dominican Republic national team.

References

External links
https://int.soccerway.com/players/angel-montes-de-oca/610093/

2001 births
Living people
Dominican Republic footballers
Association football forwards
Cibao FC players
Liga Dominicana de Fútbol players
Dominican Republic international footballers
Dominican Republic expatriate footballers
Dominican Republic expatriate sportspeople in Spain
Expatriate footballers in Spain